The Big Four or the Big League Pageants refers to the four major international beauty pageants for women – Miss World, Miss Universe, Miss International and Miss Earth. The group was first described by the China Daily newspaper in 2004 as "the world's four major beauty contests". In April 2008, the South China Morning Post described them as "four of the world's top beauty pageants"; the same description was also used by South Korea's leading newspaper, Chosun Ilbo in 2010. In 2017, the Latin Times considered the group as the "most important pageants in the world". In 2018, NBC News referred to them as the "four biggest international pageants", while Agencia EFE delineated them in 2019 as the "four most influential beauty pageants in the world".

The Big Four beauty pageants

Hundreds of thousands of beauty contests are held annually, but the Big Four are considered the most prestigious, widely covered and broadcast by media. The Wall Street Journal, BBC News, CNN, Xinhua News Agency, and global news agencies such as Reuters, Associated Press and Agence France-Presse collectively refer to the four major pageants as "Big Four" namely:

Miss World is the oldest existing major international beauty pageant. It was created in the United Kingdom by Eric Morley in 1951. Since Morley's death in 2000, his widow, Julia Morley, co-chairs the pageant.
Miss Universe is an annual international beauty contest that is run by the Miss Universe Organization. The contest was founded in 1952 by California clothing company Pacific Mills. The pageant became part of Kayser-Roth and then Gulf+Western Industries, before being acquired by Donald Trump in 1996, WME/IMG in 2015, and currently owned by Thai-based JKN Global Group in 2022.
Miss International, also called "Miss International Beauty", is a Tokyo-based international beauty pageant organized by The International Culture Association. The pageant was first held in 1960.
Miss Earth is an annual international environmental-themed beauty pageant promoting environmental awareness organized by Philippine-based Carousel Productions through the Miss Earth Foundation and was first held in 2001. The pageant is affiliated and works on projects with other institutions, including Greenpeace, World Wildlife Foundation, and United Nations Environment Program.

In April 2008, Cynthia Kanema of Zambia earned the distinction of the first woman to have participated the world's top four beauty pageants: Miss World 2003, Miss International 2004, Miss Universe 2005, and Miss Earth 2005. In 2011, Miss South Africa Bokang Montjane became the second woman to have competed in all of the Big Four pageants: Miss Earth 2007 (Top 16), Miss International 2009, Miss Universe 2011, Miss World 2011 (Top 7).

Most victorious countries/territory
The first country to win all four major international pageant titles was Brazil, when it won Miss Earth 2004. Brazil has won two Miss Universe crowns,  two Miss Earth crowns, one Miss World crown, and one Miss International crown.

In winning Miss Earth 2005, Venezuela became the second country to win titles for each of the Big Four pageants. It has produced seven Miss Universe titles,  eight Miss International titles, six Miss World titles, and two Miss Earth titles. By winning Miss Earth 2013, Venezuela became the first and so far only country to win all four pageants multiple times.

After winning Miss World 2013, the Philippines was the third country to win all titles of the Big Four pageants. The Philippines currently has six Miss International crowns, four Miss Earth crowns, four Miss Universe crowns, and one Miss World crown. By winning Miss World 2013, Miss International 2013, Miss Earth 2014, Miss Earth 2015, and Miss Universe 2015, the Philippines achieved the feat in a span of only three calendar years. The country continued its streak after winning Miss International 2016, Miss Earth 2017, and Miss Universe 2018, and currently holds the distinction of longest streak of wins in all four major beauty pageants with a streak of six successive years.

After winning Miss Earth 2019, Puerto Rico became the first territory to win all titles of the Big Four pageants. It currently has five Miss Universe crowns and two of each in Miss World and Miss International.

After winning Miss Earth 2020, the United States became the fourth country to win in all titles of the Big Four pageants. It currently has nine Miss Universe crowns, three crowns in Miss World, and three crowns in Miss International.

The following countries and territory have won each Big Four pageant at least once:

Longest streak of wins
The Philippines holds the longest streak of winning at least one of the Big Four pageant titles in a single year with wins in six consecutive years from 2013 to 2018 (Miss World 2013 and Miss International 2013, Miss Earth 2014, Miss Universe 2015 and Miss Earth 2015, Miss International 2016, Miss Earth 2017, and Miss Universe 2018), and is currently the only country in the world to win at least once in all of the Big Four pageant titles in any of its titles streak. Venezuela ranks second overall in streak of Big Four pageant wins, lasting four consecutive years from 2008 to 2011 (Miss Universe 2008, Miss Universe 2009, Miss International 2010, Miss World 2011).

Multiple wins in the same year
France became the first nation to win at least 2 of the Big 4 beauty pageant titles in the same year, winning in 1953 (Miss Universe and Miss World), followed by Brazil in 1968 (Miss Universe and Miss International), Australia in 1972 (Miss Universe and Miss World), Venezuela in 1981 (Miss Universe and Miss World) as well as in 2013 (Miss Universe and Miss Earth), India in 1994 and 2000 (Miss Universe and Miss World), Ecuador in 2011 (Miss International and Miss Earth), and the Philippines in 2013 (Miss World and Miss International) and 2015 (Miss Universe and Miss Earth).

Back-to-back wins
In Miss World, three back-to-back victories have been recorded. 
In its first two editions, Sweden recorded back-to-back with Kiki Hakansson and May-Louise Flodin in Miss World 1951 and Miss World 1952, respectively. United Kingdom contestants Ann Sidney and Lesley Langley duplicated this feat in Miss World 1964 and Miss World 1965, respectively. The most recent back-to-back Miss World victories came from India, with Yukta Mookhey in Miss World 1999 and Priyanka Chopra in Miss World 2000 edition.

In Miss Universe, Venezuela is currently the only country to win back-to-back in Miss Universe 2008 and Miss Universe 2009. Stefanía Fernandez won the Miss Universe 2009 title in which Venezuela earned a Guinness World Record to have the first Miss Universe winner succeeded by her compatriot, Miss Universe 2008 Dayana Mendoza.

In Miss Earth, the victory of Angelia Ong in Miss Earth 2015, succeeding Jamie Herrell, Miss Earth 2014, made the Philippines to date the only country to win back-to-back in the Miss Earth pageant.

Big Four beauty pageant winners by year

Debut wins

Big Four beauty pageants winners by Country/Territory

Not replaced resigned or dethroned titles appear in bold and assumed titles appear in bold underlined.

See also
 List of beauty pageants

Notes

References